John James "Jack" Stanaway (8 October 1873 – 23 December 1931), also known as Hone Haira, was a New Zealand rugby league player who represented New Zealand Māori and was an international test referee. His brother, Alex Stanaway, played rugby league for New Zealand.

Rugby league career
Alongside his brother Alex, Stanaway was part of the 1908 New Zealand Māori rugby league tour of Australia.

At Ponsonby United's first AGM on 30 July 1909, Stanaway was elected to the club's executive alongside James Carlaw (the first Chairman), Charles Dunning and Arthur Carlaw.

Stanaway became a referee in the Auckland Rugby League competition. On 25 June, during a club game, Stanaway sent off Albert Asher. The rest of the City Rovers side walked off in support of Asher. Asher became the first player to face the ARL judiciary, who cautioned him.

During the 1910 Great Britain Lions tour of New Zealand, Stanaway controlled the Lions matches against Auckland and New Zealand.

In 1911 he helped set up the Otahuhu Rovers club, becoming their first chairman.

Later years
Stanaway died on 23 December 1931.

References

1873 births
1931 deaths
New Zealand rugby league players
New Zealand Māori rugby league team players
New Zealand rugby league referees
New Zealand rugby league administrators